The following is a list of notable deaths in June 1995.

Entries for each day are listed alphabetically by surname. A typical entry lists information in the following sequence:
 Name, age, country of citizenship at birth, subsequent country of citizenship (if applicable), reason for notability, cause of death (if known), and reference.

June 1995

1
Tony Clegg, 58, British property entrepreneur.
William Robert Collinson, 82, United States District Judge.
Prudence Hyman, 81, British ballerina and actress.
Guthorm Kavli, 78, Norwegian architect and art historian.
Colin Ronan, 74, British author on the history and philosophy of science.

2
Jack Baggott, 88, Australian rules footballer.
Lenox Baker, 92, American orthopedic surgeon and pioneer in sports medicine.
Frank Clack, 83, English professional footballer.
Alexandre de Marenches, 73, French military officer.
Harper MacKay, 73, American pianist, composer and arranger of music for television and film.
Kōhei Miyauchi, 65, Japanese actor and voice actor.

3
Julia Adler, 95, American actress.
Estelle Brody, 94, American actress.
Alan Bulman, 67, Australian rules footballer.
George R. Caron, 75, American crew member of the Enola Gay during the bombing of Hiroshima.
Aubrey W. Dirlam, 81, American politician.
J. Presper Eckert, 76, American engineer, leukemia.
Ralph Friedman, 79, American author.
Adolph Lowe, 102, German sociologist and economist.
Jean-Patrick Manchette, 52, French crime novelist, pancreatic cancer.
Dilys Powell, 93, British film critic and travel writer.
Edward Scott, 76, English cricketer and rugby union player.
Arthur K. Shapiro, 72, American psychiatrist and Tourette syndrome expert.
Paul Wandel, 90, German communist politician and statesman in the German Democratic Republic.
Frank Waters, 92, American writer and novelist.

4
Alfred Beni, 72, Austrian chess International Master (IM).
Ernest Borneman, 80, German writer, sexologist, and musicologist, suicide.
Lars Brising, 80, Swedish engineer and aircraft designer.
Leo Cantor, 76, American football player.
Sergei Kapustin, 42, Soviet/Russian ice hockey player, heart attack.

5
George Byers, 78, American sprint canoer who competed in the 1956 Summer Olympics.
Bernard Chenot, 86, French politician and senior official.
Patricia Dane, 75, American film actress, lung cancer.
Trevor N. Dupuy, 79, United States Army officer and military historian, suicide.
Beatrix Tugendhut Gardner, 87, Austrian zoologist.

6
Jim Barnes, 86, New Zealand politician of the National Party.
Werner H. Bloss, 64–65, German scientist and photovoltaics expert.
Sheikh Imam, 76, Egyptian composer and singer.
Savely Kramarov, 60, Soviet, Russian-American actor, cancer.

7
Herman Branson, 80, American physicist and chemist.
Caroline Byrne, 24, Australian model, murdered.
Hsuan Hua, 77, Chinese-American Buddhist.
Eddie Lake, 79, American baseball player.
Charles Ritchie, 88, Canadian diplomat and diarist.
Winston W. Royce, 65, American computer scientist.
Joseph Tomelty, 84, Irish actor, playwright, novelist, and theatre manager.

8
Ronald and James Allridge, 34, American serial killer, execution by lethal injection.
Erik Beckman, 60, Swedish poet, novelist and playwright.
Thomas Dudley Cabot, 98, American businessman and politician.
Truda Grosslichtová, 83, Czechoslovak film actress.
Juan Carlos Onganía, 81, 35th President of Argentina.
Abdul Rahman Pazhwak, 76, Afghan poet and diplomat.
Jerry Zipkin, 80, American socialite.

9
Frank Chacksfield, 81, English, pianist, arranger and orchestra leader, Parkinson's disease.
Stephen Kaplan, 54, American journalist, paranormal investigator, and vampirologist.
Walter Landor, 81, German designer and the founder of Landor Associates.
Vivienne Malone-Mayes, 63, American mathematician and professor.
Paula Jean Myers-Pope, 60, American diver and Olympic medallist.
Lincoln Ragsdale, 68, American civil rights leader.
N. G. Ranga, 94, Indian freedom fighter, classical liberal, parliamentarian and farmer leader.
Gordon Rowe, 79, New Zealand cricketer.
Zoilo Versalles, 55, Cuban baseball player.

10
Ali-Asghar Bahari, 89–90, Iranian musician and kamancheh player.
Mikel Dufrenne, 85, French philosopher and aesthetician.
Inamul Hasan Kandhlawi, 77, Indian Islamic scholar.
Bruno Lawrence, 54, English-New Zealand musician and actor, lung cancer.
Madeleine Moreau, 67, French diver.
Ronald Morrisby, 80, Tasmanian cricketer.
Lindsey Nelson, 76, American sportscaster, Parkinson's disease.

11
Robert Finch, 95, Canadian poet and academic.
Rodel Naval, 42, Filipino actor, singer, and songwriter, AIDS-related complications.
Christoph von Fürer-Haimendorf, 85, Austrian ethnologist and professor
Lovelace Watkins, 62, American singer.

12
Julius Bürger, 98, Austrian-American composer, pianist and conductor.
William G. Connare, 83, American prelate of the Roman Catholic Church.
Talbot Duckmanton, 73, Australian broadcaster and radio and television administrator.
Arturo Benedetti Michelangeli, 75, Italian pianist.
Roger Roger, 83, French arranger, composer and conductor.
Pierre Russell, 45, American basketball player.
Egon Svensson, 81, Swedish bantamweight Greco-Roman wrestler and Olympian.
Ede Vadászi, 71, Hungarian basketball player.

13
Enrique Alarcón, 78, Spanish art director active in film.
Jean Lee Latham, 93, American writer.
David Parry, 52, British-Canadian folk musician, actor, stage director, and academic, heart attack.
Ginger Smock, 75, American violinist and orchestra leader.

14
Els Aarne, 78, Estonian composer.
Jack Chertok, 88, American film and television producer.
Rory Gallagher, 47, Irish blues and rock guitarist, liver failure.
Bobby Grim, 70, American racecar driver, cancer.
Rangimārie Hetet, 103, New Zealand Māori master weaver.
Jos Hoevenaers, 62, Belgian cyclist.
Timothy Scott, 57, American actor (Butch Cassidy and the Sundance Kid, Footloose, Fried Green Tomatoes), heart attack.
Sony Lab'ou Tansi, 48, Congolese novelist, playwright, and poet, AIDS-related complications.
Roger Zelazny, 58, American science fiction writer, colorectal cancer.

15
Robert Anderson, 76, American gospel singer and composer.
John Vincent Atanasoff, 91, American physicist and inventor of the first digital computer, stroke.
Charles Bennett, 95, English screenwriter.
P. K. Chishala, 37-38, Zambian musician.
E. Bronson Ingram II, 63, American billionaire heir, filantropist, and businessman, cancer.
Preben Lerdorff Rye, 78, Danish film actor.

16
Vladimir Aleksenko, 72, Soviet Air Force general.
Thomas Bolger, 90, Australian wrestler who competed in the 1928 Summer Olympics.
Tore Edman, 90, Swedish ski jumper.
Syd Einfeld, 85, Australian politician and Jewish community leader.
Senu Abdul Rahman, 76, Malaysian politician, minister and diplomat.
Jack Wagner, 69, American radio personality and actor.

17
Danny Brown, 69, American NFL football player.
Bruce Campbell, 85, American baseball player.
David Ennals, Baron Ennals, 72, British  politician and human rights activist, pancreatic cancer.
Clarence Greene, 81, American screenwriter and film producer.
Mary Kirkwood, 90, American artist and professor.
Claire Sterling, 75, American author and journalist.
Kim Dongni, 81, South Korean writer.
Shaul Yisraeli, 85, Belarusian Orthodox rabbi.
Bob Young, 52, American gridiron football player.

18
Karl Atzenroth, 99, German politician and businessman.
Keith Bennett, 64, Canadian football player.
Arthur Howard, 85, British character actor.
Robert Schlienz, 71, German football player.
Harry Tisch, 68, East German politician and trade unionist, heart failure.

19
Józef Arkusz, 74, Polish film director and producer.
Luis Caballero, 51, Colombian painter, watercolourist, pastellist and lithographer.
Murray Dickie, 71, Scottish tenor.
David Griggs, 28, American gridiron football player, traffic accident.
Richard Pape, 79, British writer and POW escaper .
Peter Townsend, 80, British RAF officer and flying ace and romantic partner to Princess Margaret, stomach cancer.

20
Julian Blaustein, 82, American film producer, cancer.
Emil Cioran, 84, Romanian philosopher and essayist, Alzheimer's disease.
Gianni Ghidini, 65, Italian road racing cyclist.
Harry Gwala, 74, South African activist and politician.
Al Hansen, 67, American artist and member of the Fluxus movement.
Albert Wyckmans, 97, Belgian cyclist.

21
Al Adamson, 65, American filmmaker and actor, homicide.
Darnell Collins, 33, American spree killer, shot.
Jerry Fairbanks, 90, American film and television director and producer.
Laurence McKinley Gould, 98, American geologist and polar explorer.
Larry Griffin, 40, American convicted murderer, execution by lethal injection.
Jun Hamamura, 89, Japanese actor.
Tristan Jones, 66, British sailor and author.
Ulrich Thein, 65, German actor, film director and screenwriter.

22
Raúl Astor, 70, Mexican actor, director, producer and announcer.
Yves Congar, 91, French catholic cardinal.
Leonid Derbenyov, 64, Soviet/Russian poet and lyricist, stomach cancer.
Nils-Joel Englund, 88, Swedish cross-country skier.
Gerhard Nenning, 54, Austrian former alpine skier.

23
Harvey Barnett, 69, Australian intelligence officer.
Marvin Camras, 79, electrical engineer and inventor, kidney failure.
Francesco Camusso, 87, Italian professional road racing cyclist.
Morris Cohen, 84, American who was a spy for the Soviet Union.
Atef El Tayeb, 47, Egyptian film director, cardiovascular disease.
Roger Grimsby, 66, American television news reporter and journalist, lung cancer.
Sailor Roberts, 64, American poker player.
Tony Romeo, 56, American songwriter, heart attack.
Jonas Salk, 80, American medical researcher, heart failure.
Emile Santiago, 96, American costume designer.
Anatoly Tarasov, 76, Russian ice hockey player and coach.

24
Inshan Ali, 45, Trinidad and Tobago cricketer.
James Batten, 59, American journalist and publisher, brain tumor, brain cancer.
Marjorie Cameron, 73, American artist, poet, actress and occultist, brain tumor.
Robert Guthrie, 78, American microbiologist.
Henri Hollanders, 72, Belgian basketball player.
Esther Rome, 49, American women's health activist and writer, breast cancer.
Andrew J. Transue, 92, American attorney and politician.
Meir Zorea, 72, Israeli general and politician.

25
Neil Begg, 80, New Zealand paediatrician, historian and cricketer.
Moshe Ben-Ze'ev, 83, Israeli jurist and Attorney General.
Warren E. Burger, 87, 15th Chief Justice of the United States Supreme Court, heart attack.
Li Jukui, 90, Chinese general and politician.
Qiu Miaojin, 26, Taiwanese novelist, suicide.
Sergei Popov, 64, Russian marathon runner.
Ernest Walton, 91, Irish physicist.

26
John Jefferson Bray, 82, Australian lawyer, judge, and academic.
Jason Callahan, 19, American man and unidentified body and missing person case.
Kazimierz Wichniarz, 80, Polish film and theatre actor.
Edgar Williams, 82, British Army military intelligence officer and historian.

27
Jacques Berque, 85, French Islamic scholar and sociologist.
Yoni Chen, 41, Israeli actor, voice actor, and puppeteer, AIDS.
Efrem Kurtz, 94, Russian conductor.
Nida Senff, 75, Dutch backstroke swimmer and Olympic champion.
Dominic Tang, 87, Chinese Jesuit priest, pneumonia.
Gordon Wilson, 69, Irish politician and pacifist, heart attack.

28
Philip Bonsal, 92, American diplomat with the U.S. Department of State.
Arne Mattsson, 75, Swedish film director.
Maurinho, 62, Brazilian football player.
Donald Sinclair, 84, British veterinary surgeon who was the inspiration for All Creatures Great and Small, suicide.

29
Ted Allan, 79, Canadian screenwriter, author, and poet.
Francisco Avitia, 80, Mexican singer.
Noel Dyson, 78, English actress, cancer.
Sicco Mansholt, 86, Dutch politician.
Roy Rowland, 84, American film director for MGM.
Lana Turner, 74, American actress (Peyton Place, Imitation of Life, The Postman Always Rings Twice), esophageal cancer.

30
Georgy Beregovoy, 74, Russian cosmonaut.
Roger Chapelet, 91, French maritime painter.
Gale Gordon, 89, American actor (The Lucy Show, Our Miss Brooks, The 'Burbs), lung cancer.
Phyllis Hyman, 45, American singer and actress, suicide.
Ya'akov Meridor, 81, Israeli politician, Irgun commander and businessman.
Mario Monticelli, 93, Italian chess player.
Jorge Peixinho, 55, Portuguese composer, pianist and conductor.
Barney Simon, 63, South African theatre director and writer.
Gavriil Troyepolsky, 89, Soviet/Russian writer.
Nazariy Yaremchuk, 43, Soviet/Ukrainian Hutsul singer.

References 

1995-06
 06